Barons Lane Halt railway station was a halt that served the village of Purleigh, Essex. The sidings at this location were opened with the line on 1 October 1889, but the halt was not opened until 10 July 1922 by the Great Eastern Railway on the branch line (Engineer's Line Reference WFM) from Woodham Ferrers to Maldon West Halt.

It was closed in September 1939 but the line remained in use for goods traffic until 1959. Vic Mitchell says that freight traffic ceased on 1 April 1953.

References

External links
 History of the Crouch valley Line
 Barons Lane Halt on navigable old O. S. map
 GER Society webpage containing photograph of the station in the 1920s

Disused railway stations in Essex
Former Great Eastern Railway stations
Railway stations in Great Britain opened in 1922
Railway stations in Great Britain closed in 1939